Antonio Juez Nieto (March 7, 1893 – September 25, 1963) was a Spanish Art Nouveau painter, writer, illustrator active in Badajoz.

References
 Biography at the Real Academia de la Historia

1893 births
1963 deaths
20th-century Spanish painters
20th-century Spanish male artists
Spanish male painters
Art Nouveau painters
Art Nouveau illustrators
Spanish illustrators